Cool is a town in Parker County, Texas, United States. The population was 157 at the 2010 census.

The origin of the name "Cool" is obscure.

Geography

Cool is located at  (32.798472, –98.012781).

Demographics

As of the census of 2000, there were 162 people, 62 households, and 49 families residing in the city. The population density was 98.9 people per square mile (38.1/km2). There were 69 housing units at an average density of 42.1 per square mile (16.2/km2). The racial makeup of the city was 96.91% White, 2.47% from other races, and 0.62% from two or more races. Hispanic or Latino of any race were 3.70% of the population.

There were 62 households, out of which 32.3% had children under the age of 18 living with them, 64.5% were married couples living together, 11.3% had a female householder with no husband present, and 19.4% were non-families. 17.7% of all households were made up of individuals, and 8.1% had someone living alone who was 65 years of age or older. The average household size was 2.61 and the average family size was 2.92.

In the city, the population was spread out, with 24.7% under the age of 18, 4.3% from 18 to 24, 27.8% from 25 to 44, 22.8% from 45 to 64, and 20.4% who were 65 years of age or older. The median age was 41 years. For every 100 females, there were 90.6 males. For every 100 females age 18 and over, there were 96.8 males.

The median income for a household in the city was $30,938, and the median income for a family was $31,875. Males had a median income of $36,875 versus $22,917 for females. The per capita income for the city was $14,112. About 16.4% of families and 20.9% of the population were below the poverty line, including 26.7% of those under the age of eighteen and 15.2% of those 65 or over.

Education
Public education in the city of Cool is provided by the Millsap Independent School District.

Climate
The climate in this area is characterized by relatively high temperatures and evenly distributed precipitation throughout the year.  The Köppen Climate System describes the weather as humid subtropical, and uses the abbreviation Cfa.

References

Dallas–Fort Worth metroplex
Cities in Texas
Cities in Parker County, Texas